X rating is a motion picture rating reserved for the most explicit films.

Rated X may also refer to:
 "Rated "X"", a 1972 song by Loretta Lynn and covered by the White Stripes
 "Rated X", a song by Spiritualized from their 2003 album Amazing Grace
 Rated X (album), a 1995 album by Deranged
 Rated X (film), a 2000 film

See also
 Rated R (disambiguation)